Verizon Center may refer to:
 Mayo Clinic Health System Event Center (formerly Verizon Center), a multi-purpose arena in Mankato, Minnesota
 Capital One Arena (formerly Verizon Center), an arena in Washington, D.C.

See also
Simmons Bank Arena, formerly Verizon Arena, in Little Rock, Arkansas
SNHU Arena, formerly Verizon Wireless Arena, in Manchester, New Hampshire